Spyridon "Spyros" Motsenigos (alternate spelling: Spiridon, Spiros) (born January 1, 1992) is a Greek professional basketball player for Milon of the Greek C Basketball League. He is 1.94 m (6 ft 4  in) tall, and he plays at the point guard and shooting guard positions.

Professional career
Motsenigos began his professional career in the Greek Basket League with Rethymno, in 2011. He moved to Panionios in 2012. After that, he played with the Greek clubs Pagrati, Holargos, Diagoras Dryopideon, and Eleftheroupoli Kavalas.

He joined the Greek club Charilaos Trikoupis, in 2020.

In June 2021, Motsenigos joined the historic Nea Smyrni club Milon B.C.

National team career
With the junior national teams of Greece, Mostenigos played at the following tournaments: the 2008 FIBA Europe Under-16 Championship, the 2009 FIBA Europe Under-18 Championship, the 2010 FIBA Europe Under-18 Championship, the 2011 FIBA Europe Under-20 Championship, and the 2012 FIBA Europe Under-20 Championship.

References

External links
EuroCup Profile
FIBA Europe Profile
Eurobasket.com Profile
Greek Basket League Profile 
Draftexpress.com Profile

1992 births
Living people
Charilaos Trikoupis B.C. players
Diagoras Dryopideon B.C. players
Greek men's basketball players
Greek Basket League players
Holargos B.C. players
Panionios B.C. players
Pagrati B.C. players
Point guards
Rethymno B.C. players
Shooting guards
Basketball players from Athens